Fade In is a 1968 American film starring Burt Reynolds, who said, "It should have been called Fade Out."

Cast 
 Burt Reynolds - Rob
 Barbara Loden - Jean
 Patricia Casey - Pat
 Noam Pitlik - Russ
 James Hampton - Bud
 Joseph V. Perry - George
 Lawrence Heller - Stu

Production
Filming started in July 1967 and was shot at the same time as the Western Blue on the same location in Moab, Utah, using some footage from that movie although it had a separate story, cast and crew. Judd Bernard, who produced both, said "Both pictures are either going to be great or be disaster areas. There will be no middle ground with either one." Parts of the film were shot at Professor Valley, Castle Valley, Hittle Bottom, Moab, Dead Horse Point, and Arches in Utah.

It was the first Hollywood made film to show someone taking a contraception pill.

It was the first film to be released credited to the pseudonym Alan Smithee. The pseudonym had been created for Death of a Gunfighter, but that film was not released until the following year.

Reception
"It was screened for Bob Evans at Paramount and I think he locked it up in chains", said Reynolds years later. "It's never been heard from since."

"It's the best thing I've ever done", Reynolds added. "An American version of A Man and a Woman."

References

External links

1968 television films
1968 films
American television films
Films shot in Utah
Films credited to Alan Smithee
Films directed by Jud Taylor
Paramount Pictures films